The noble family of the Scaliger, or Scaligeri, were Lords of Verona from the 13th to early 15th century.

Scaliger may also refer to persons dubiously claiming to be of the noble Verona Scaliger family:

 Julius Caesar Scaliger (1484–1558), Italian scholar and physician 
 Joseph Justus Scaliger (1540–1609), French-Dutch classicist, son of the preceding